Metopidiotrichidae is a family of millipedes in the order Chordeumatida. These millipedes range from 4 mm to 17 mm in length. Adult millipedes in this family have 32 segments (counting the collum as the first segment and the telson as the last), not the 30 segments usually found in this order. Adult males in this family (e.g., Reginaterreuma monroei, R. daviesae, R. unicolor, R. major, and Neocambrisoma raveni) often feature a reduced or vestigial leg pair 10 as part of the gonopod complex, in addition to the two leg pairs (pairs 8 and 9) typically modified into gonopods in this order. There are about 9 genera and at least 70 described species in Metopidiotrichidae.

Genera
These nine genera belong to the family Metopidiotrichidae:
 Australeuma Golovatch, 1986
 Malayothrix Verhoeff, 1929
 Metopidiothrix Attems, 1907
 Neocambrisoma Mauriès, 1987
 Nesiothrix Shear & Mesibov, 1997
 Nipponothrix Shear & Tanabe, 1994
 Pocockia Silvestri, 1895
 Reginaterreuma Mauriès, 1987
 Schedotrigona Silvestri, 1903

References

Further reading

 
 

Chordeumatida
Millipedes of North America
Millipede families